Josef Kaufmann Racing is a motorsport team from Germany. It mainly operates in the Eurocup Formula Renault 2.0 as well as Formula Renault 2.0 Northern European Cup. The team was founded in 1982.

History
In 1982, Josef Kaufmann Racing was founded by Josef Kaufmann, who was a racing driver and raced in his own team in the German Formula Three Championship. In the first year of the team's existence Gerhard Berger and Kaufmann finished third and fourth respectively in the German Formula 3. Josef Kaufmann Racing first drivers' title was achieved by Volker Weidler, who won the German Formula Three Championship in 1985. Their next success was in 1994, when Arnd Meier won B-Cup of the German F3 Championship. The team remained in the German Formula Three Championship till 2002.

In 2003 the team decided to concentrate on Formula BMW ADAC championship, which they joined in 2002. Nico Hülkenberg won their first Formula BMW ADAC title in 2005. The success was repeated in the following year by Christian Vietoris. In 2008, ADAC series was merged with UK series into Formula BMW Europe. Esteban Gutiérrez brought their first title in the series and with help of Kazeem Manzur and Marco Wittmann their first teams' title ever. The team repeated titles in both the drivers' and teams' championships in 2010 with Robin Frijns.

As Formula BMW Europe was folded, the German outfit decided to move to Eurocup Formula Renault 2.0 in 2011 and Frijns won another drivers' title for the team. Stoffel Vandoorne achieved their second Eurocup title in the following season. Lando Norris collected another Eurocup drivers' championship for the German squad in 2016. Also the team won the teams' championship in Formula Renault 2.0 Northern European Cup in 2014 and 2015, as well as drivers' title for Louis Delétraz.

For the 2017 and seasons, the team signed Sacha Fenestraz,  Luis Leeds and French F4 champion Ye Yifei. The team failed to defend teams' title but Sacha Fenestraz achieved drivers' title.

In 2018, the team retained Ye and hired former Red Bull Junior Richard Verschoor and karting champion and Toyota Racing Series race winner Clément Novalak, with Ye claiming third in the drivers' standings. At the end of the season, the team withdrew from the championship.

Former series results

Formula BMW ADAC

Formula BMW Europe

Eurocup Formula Renault 2.0

† Guest driver, who was ineligible for championship points.

Formula Renault 2.0 Northern European Cup

‡Shared position and points for the other team.

† ineligible for championship points.

Timeline

References

External links
 

German auto racing teams
Auto racing teams established in 1982
1982 establishments in Germany
German Formula 3 teams
Formula BMW teams
Formula Renault Eurocup teams